Punch Line San Francisco is a comedy club located at 444 Battery St in San Francisco's Financial District.  It has a sister club in Sacramento, California, and is also associated with Cobb's Comedy Club, now in the North Beach neighborhood of San Francisco.  It is San Francisco's oldest running comedy club.

History
The Punch Line was opened, circa October 1978, by Jeffrey Pollack and sold to Bill Graham in 1981.  The building was adjacent to the Old Waldorf, a music venue originally opened in 1976 whose owner (Jeffrey Pollack) booked all the acts he could find, including music legends such as U2, Metallica, Dire Straits, Elvis Costello, R.E.M., AC/DC, and more.

The Punch Line San Francisco, the Punch Line Sacramento, and Cobb's Comedy Club were all owned and operated by Bill Graham Presents up until the death of Bill Graham in 1991. The company was taken over by a group of employees who later sold it to SFX Promotions. It was subsequently sold to Clear Channel Entertainment. On December 21, 2005, Clear Channel Communications completed the spin-off of Live Nation, formerly known as Clear Channel Entertainment. Live Nation is an independent company (NYSE: LYV) and is no longer owned by Clear Channel.

Comics such as Robin Williams, Ellen DeGeneres, Rosie O'Donnell, Drew Carey, Chris Rock, Patton Oswalt, and Dana Carvey took their first comedic steps on the Punch Line stage. The Punch Line's dedication to comic tradition has earned it the San Francisco Examiner and the San Francisco Chronicle's Readers' Choice Award for the Best Comedy Club.  Today, The Punch Line is the only full-time comedy club in San Francisco.

In May 2019, the club announced it could not renew its lease with the current property owners (a subsidiary of Morgan Stanley) and was looking for a new location. Stand-up comic Dave Chappelle launched a #savethepunchline campaign and rallied SF city supervisor Aaron Peskin and Bay Area comedians W. Kamau Bell and Nato Green. In July 2019, an agreement was reached between Morgan Stanley, Google (new tenant of the building complex) and the Punch Line to secure the renewal of the lease. The club also received the Legacy Business status from the city of San Francisco, which safeguards the club as a cultural institution.

Venue
The Punch Line San Francisco is open for business almost every Tuesday thru Sunday to ticket-holders ages 18+ with valid photo I.D. The box office is open on show days from 3:00 – 6:00 p.m. There is a two drink minimum per person. Cameras and video/audio recording devices are not permitted.

Sister clubs
Cobb's Comedy Club is located in the North Beach neighborhood of San Francisco and has been a comedy staple in the city for more than 30 years.

Punch Line Sacramento is Sacramento’s premier comedy club, and was opened and operated by Bill Graham Presents in 1991 as an expansion of the Punch Line San Francisco.

Notable comedians

 Robin Williams
 Franklyn Ajaye 
 Dave Chappelle
 Ellen DeGeneres
 Rosie O'Donnell
 Drew Carey
 Chris Rock
 Dana Carvey
 Margaret Cho
 Louis CK
 Bobby Slayton
 Wanda Sykes
 Greg Giraldo
 Jim Gaffigan
 Sarah Silverman
 Zach Galifianakis
 Dave Attell
 Daniel Tosh
 Ngaio Bealum
 Aziz Ansari
 George Lopez
 David Cross
 Pappas & Diederich 
 Greg Proops
 Paul F. Tompkins
 Ron Funches
 Al Madrigal
 Patrice O'Neal
 Greg Fitzsimmons
 Maria Bamford
 Dana Gould
 Mitch Fatel
 Brian Posehn
 Will Durst
 Marcella Arguello
 Greg Behrendt
 Patton Oswalt
 Doug Benson
 Mitch Hedberg
 Lewis Black
 Bill Burr
 Demetri Martin
 Jim Norton
 W. Kamau Bell
 Arj Barker
 Jim Short
 Tony Camin
 Robert Schimmel
 Doug Stanhope
 Paul Mooney
 Tom Rhodes
 Jay Leno
 Garry Shandling
 Jerry Seinfeld
 Dat Phan
 Kevin McDonald
 Kevin Pollak
 Barry Sobel
 John Mulaney
 Hasan Minhaj
 Sue Murphy
 Laurie Kilmartin

References

External links
 Official website

Comedy clubs in California
Entertainment venues in San Francisco
North Beach, San Francisco
Live Nation Entertainment
1978 establishments in California
Financial District, San Francisco